A sept is a division of a family, usually of a Scottish or Irish family.

Sept may also refer to:
 "Sept.", a common abbreviation for "September" (a month)
 La Sept, a former French television channel
 La Sept (album), a 1989 Michael Nyman album promoting the television station
 A type of temple used in the Religion of the Seven in the A Song of Ice and Fire / Game of Thrones fictional scenario

See also
 Sep (disambiguation)